Hunton Andrews Kurth LLP is an American law firm created by the merger of Hunton & Williams LLP and Andrews Kurth Kenyon LLP on April 2, 2018. The firm has offices in 20 cities, primarily in the United States.

History
Hunton & Williams (formerly Munford, Hunton, Williams & Anderson) was founded on November 1, 1901 in Richmond, Virginia, by Henry W. Anderson, Eppa Hunton Jr., Beverley B. Munford, and E. Randolph Williams. The firm is focused on litigation, business, and finance law. The firm changed names many times over the years; its seventh name, in 1976, was Hunton & Williams; it became Hunton & Williams LLP in 2003. The firm's most notable member, a name partner from 1954 until 1972, was Lewis F. Powell Jr., who focused on corporate law and representing clients such as the Tobacco Institute until he became a member of the U.S. Supreme Court in 1971.

The firm's initial hire of a woman was Elizabeth Tompkins, the first woman graduate of the University of Virginia Law School, who worked as a summer clerk at Hunton & Williams in 1921 and 1922. In 1943, during the Second World War, two women lawyers were hired to work at Hunton & Williams: Sarah Geer Dale and Nan Ross McConnell. Dale's first case involved a labor-law issue for Newport News Shipbuilding & Dry Dock. She left the firm in 1945 to get married and retired from the practice of law. McConnell stayed on until 1948, when she married.

Hunton & Williams was the first law firm in the United States to open an office solely for the practice of law pro bono. The firm has a Centre for Information Policy Leadership, which focuses on privacy and data protection work. The managing partner, Walfrido J. "Wally" Martinez, has held that position since March 2006.

Controversies
The firm, when operating as Hunton & Williams, employed William "Bill" Wehrum as a partner. Wehrum, who as a Hunton attorney represented oil and gas corporations, left his partner role when he was appointed to a top position in the Trump Administration Environmental Protection Agency (EPA). Wehrum's confirmation hearings resulted in controversy, when Wehrum was asked "Are you familiar with the increasing acidity of the ocean?" Wehrum said this was merely an 'allegation.' Wehrum's answers at the confirmation hearing attracted critical coverage.  Wehrum was confirmed by a party-line vote and moved from Hunton to the EPA, where he has been described as "delivering for ex-clients." Wehrum's private meetings with oil and gas industry ex-clients, many from his time working at Hunton, have attracted criticism "despite federal ethics rules intended to limit such interactions."

References

External links
 Hunton Andrews Kurth LLP
 Centre for Information Policy Leadership

Law firms established in 1901
Law firms based in Richmond, Virginia
1901 establishments in Virginia